Alexander Pavlovich Smolensky (born July 6, 1954) is a Russian business oligarch.

Biography 
Alexander Smolensky began his business activities on the black market of the so-called "shadow economy". His private ventures included trading foreign currency, moonlighting on a second job in a bakery with a counterfeit permit as well as typesetting and printing Bibles using government presses and ink. He was arrested by the KGB in 1981 and charged with economic crimes. Subsequently, he was sentenced to two years of hard labour although he only served one day.

Alexander Smolensky is considered the first private banker of Russia. Alexander Smolensky is the founder and president of one of the largest private banks in Russia - Bank Stolichny. In 1992, he set up the country's first debit card processing system. In 1998, he merged his agribusiness assets in Agroprombank (acquired in 1996), which was renamed SBS-Agro and gave the businessman a tremendous influence at the Kremlin.  SBS-Agro collapsed in the 1998 Russian financial crisis wiping out its investors' savings. When asked what he owed his investors he replied: "dead donkey ears". He also declared that his banking activities had not went bankrupt, but solely split into several structures spread throughout the country and managed by an advanced computer system. In 1999, Russian prosecutors issued a warrant for his arrest including charges of embezzlement and money laundering. This warrant, however, was later dropped.

Smolensky's net worth in 2003 was estimated to be 230 million USD. By 2003, he renamed his group OVK Bank, turned it over to his son Nikolay, who sold it to Vladimir Potanin two months later. In 2004, his son Nikolay Smolensky purchased the sportscar maker TVR. (The company went bankrupt in 2007)

In the period from 2006 to 2011, the former oligarch became interested in literary work and published 7 books in the political thriller genre. The opuses were based on real stories from the life of the Russian elite.

After 2011, Smolensky disappeared from the public eye. Reportedly lives in Vienna.

In 2019, a company associated with Smolensky sold the last 4 office complexes in Moscow, including the famous Alexander House, the former headquarters of Vladimir Putin. The deal is valued at over €60 million.

See also 
Semibankirschina

References

Books 

David E. Hoffman. The Oligarchs: Wealth and Power in the New Russia, Public Affairs (2003) 

1954 births
Living people
Russian newspaper publishers (people)
Businesspeople from Moscow
Russian bankers
Soviet bankers
Russian billionaires
Russian people of Jewish descent
Russian oligarchs